The National Division 1 is the third tier of rugby league in France, below the Elite Two Championship and above the National Division 2. The season runs from September to April. 

From season 2012–13 the league was split into regions East and West, each team plays each other in their regional league home and away with the top sides then meeting in a series of play-off matches resulting in a Grand Final. The winner can be promoted to Elite Two subject to having adequate finances and facilities. Occasionally if the winners aren't able to be promoted, or opt out, then the team finishing second could be promoted.

History 

The league was first played for in 1949-50 under the title 2nd Division. The 2nd Division was played for until 1966 when the competition, after a league restructure, was ended. Brought back in 1976 under the title National 2 representing clubs at the 3rd tier. In 2008 the competition was rebranded and called National Division 1. For the start of season 2012–13 the league was split into East and West regional divisions.

Teams

West

East

Past winners

See also

Rugby league in France
France national rugby league team
France women's national rugby league team
French Rugby League Championship
Elite One Championship
Elite Two Championship
National Division 2
Lord Derby Cup
Coupe Falcou
Paul Dejean Cup
French rugby league system

References

External links

Rugby league competitions in France